Ivan-Tojik is a jamoat in north-west Tajikistan. It is located in Kuhistoni Mastchoh District in Sughd Region. The jamoat has a total population of 13,578 (2015). It consists of 18 villages, including Padrokh (the seat), Esizi Poyon, Hadishahr, Mehron and Ustung.

References

Populated places in Sughd Region
Jamoats of Tajikistan